Events in the year 2021 in Brunei.

Incumbents
Sultan: Hassanal Bolkiah

Events
Ongoing — COVID-19 pandemic in Brunei

Deaths
 

29 May – Cornelius Sim, Roman Catholic cardinal, apostolic vicar of Brunei Darulassam (born 1951).

References

 

 
2020s in Brunei
Years of the 21st century in Brunei
Brunei
Brunei